Keith Reaser (born July 31, 1991) is a former American football cornerback. He was drafted by the San Francisco 49ers in the fifth round of the 2014 NFL Draft. He played college football at Florida Atlantic.

College career
Reaser tore his ACL in a game against the University of Alabama at Birmingham Blazers. In his college career for the Owls, he recorded 32 starts, 158 tackles, five interceptions, and one fumble recovery.

Professional career

San Francisco 49ers
Reaser was drafted by the San Francisco 49ers in the fifth round, 170th overall, in the 2014 NFL Draft.

On September 16, 2017, Reaser was released by the 49ers.

Kansas City Chiefs
On September 19, 2017, Reaser was signed to the Kansas City Chiefs' practice squad. He was promoted to the active roster on December 15, 2017.

On September 1, 2018, Reaser was waived with an injury designation by the Chiefs. After going unclaimed on waivers, he was placed on the Chiefs injured reserve. He was released with an injury settlement on September 12, 2018.

Orlando Apollos
In 2019, Reaser joined the Orlando Apollos of the Alliance of American Football.  During week 2 of the 2019 AAF season, after a game against the San Antonio Commanders where he had 2 tackles, 3 pass deflections, and a 38-yard interception return, Reaser was named the defensive player of the week. Reaser recorded 12 tackles and three interceptions in eight games with the Apollos before the AAF suspended operations.

Kansas City Chiefs (second stint)
Reaser signed with the Kansas City Chiefs on April 4, 2019. He suffered a torn Achilles in practice and was placed on injured reserve on August 8, 2019. Without Reaser, The Chiefs won Super Bowl LIV 31–20 against his former team San Francisco 49ers.

Personal life
Reaser's cousin is Sean Taylor, who played for the Washington Redskins and served as an inspiration to him.

References

1991 births
Living people
Players of American football from Miami
Miami Killian Senior High School alumni
American football cornerbacks
Florida Atlantic Owls football players
San Francisco 49ers players
Kansas City Chiefs players
Orlando Apollos players